Sally Heller (born 1956) is an American artist. She uses everyday materials to make large installations that are often site-specific.

Exhibitions 

 1993 Trains of Thought, Grand Street IND subway station, New York
 2004 Hanging by a Thread, installation, Contemporary Arts Center, New Orleans
 2005 Calamitrees, installation, Montserrat College of Art, Beverly, Massachusetts
 2005 Material Minutiae, installation, Richard E. Peeler Art Center, DePauw University, Greencastle, Indiana
 2006 Stumped, installation, Georgia College and State University, Milledgeville, Georgia
 2007 Up/Rooted, installation and photographs, Gallery Bienvenu, New Orleans, LA
 2008 Bloom 'n Doom, Miami University Art Museum, Oxford, Ohio
 2008–2017 Scraphouse, New Orleans: installation of public sculpture funded by the Joan Mitchell Foundation, New Orleans
 2009 In the Thicket of It, installation, Whitespace Gallery, Atlanta, Georgia
 2010 A Siren’s Call, installation, Museum of Science and Art, Baton Rouge, Louisiana
 2012 Lewdicrous, installation, The Front Gallery, New Orleans
 2014 Linked, outdoor public work, New Orleans
 2016 Orange Alert, installation, Moore College of Art and Design, Philadelphia
 2016  Second Story, metal site-specific sculpture in a private park in St. Rosa, LA
 2017 Lawndale, installation, The Pirate's Alley Faulkner Society, Houston, Texas
 2017 Mind Over Mayhem, installation, Fogelman Galleries of Contemporary Art, University of Memphis, Memphis, Tennessee

References 

1956 births
Living people
American installation artists
20th-century American women artists
21st-century American women artists
University of Wisconsin–Madison alumni
Virginia Commonwealth University alumni